Marcus "Marky" Andrew Law Child (born 2 March 1991) is a retired New Zealand field hockey player, who played as a midfielder or forward for the New Zealand national team.

Personal life
Marcus Child was born and raised in Auckland, New Zealand. He has an older brother, Simon, who also plays representative hockey for New Zealand.

Career
Child started playing hockey when he was four years old. He plays for Auckland in the New Zealand Hockey League. In the 2018–19 season he played for Pinoké in the Dutch Hoofdklasse.

Child made his senior international debut for the Black Sticks in 2010. Since his debut, he has been a regular inclusion in the side. In 2018, he was a silver medallist at the Commonwealth Games held in Gold Coast, Australia. In December 2020 he announced his retirement from the national team.

References

External links
 

1991 births
Living people
New Zealand male field hockey players
Male field hockey midfielders
Male field hockey forwards
2014 Men's Hockey World Cup players
2018 Men's Hockey World Cup players
Men's Hoofdklasse Hockey players
Expatriate field hockey players
New Zealand expatriate sportspeople in the Netherlands
Commonwealth Games silver medallists for New Zealand
Commonwealth Games medallists in field hockey
Field hockey players at the 2018 Commonwealth Games
Medallists at the 2018 Commonwealth Games